The men's Greco-Roman 84 kilograms is a competition featured at the 2003 World Wrestling Championships, and was held at the Palais des Sports Robert Oubron in Créteil, France from 2 to 4 October 2003.

Results

Preliminary round

Pool 1

Pool 2

Pool 3

Pool 4

Pool 5

Pool 6

Pool 7

Pool 8

Pool 9

Pool 10

Pool 11

Pool 12

Pool 13

Pool 14

Knockout round

References

Men's Greco-Roman 84 kg